Hathi Parbat, also known as Elephant Peak, is a mountain in the Garhwal Himalayas in India. It is located in the Chamoli district of Uttarakhand state.

Legend
Two huge rocks on a spur of Hathi Parbat are described as a crow (Kakabhushundi) and an eagle (Garuda). It is believed that the crow is animatedly conversing with eagle on the affairs of the universe as it's described in Ramayana. Another version has it that a learned Brahmin of Ayodhya once incurred the wrath of the sage Lomasa who lived here and was changed into the form of crow by the sage.

Access
Hathi Parbat can be reached from Vishnuprayag or Ghangaria, which is close to Valley of Flowers. The approach from Ghangaria is a little easier but longer. From Govindghat, there is an 18 km bridle path which runs through the Bhyundar valley and Bhyundar village up to Ghanghariya. Kakbhushundi Tal & Guari Parvat Lies in the vicinity of Hathi Parbat. Nearby places are Bhyundar, Jelam, Shyama and Juma. The Dhauliganga River flows nearby.

First Ascent
An Indian team comprising Sonam Gyatso, Lt. Kaushal, H. C. Rawat, Thondup Tsering, Lakpa Tensing, D. S. Sisodia, Dawa Norbu and Sonam Wangyal made the first ascent of Hathi Parbat (22,070 feet) On 6 and 7 June, 1963.

See also
 List of mountains in India
 List of Himalayan peaks of Uttarakhand
 List of Ultras of the Himalayas

References

Mountains of Uttarakhand
Geography of Chamoli district
Six-thousanders of the Himalayas
Elephants in India